The pygmy batis (Batis perkeo) is a very small insectivorous bird which finds its food foraging among leaves, it is a member of the wattle-eyes family, the Platysteiridae. It occurs in the dry savannahs of north-eastern Africa.

Description
The pygmy batis, as its name suggests, is a tiny, rather dumpy but dapper black, white and grey bird with similarities to the flycatchers. The male has a bluish-grey head and back with a contrasting black face mask and short white supercilium above the yellow eye. The rump and lower back are spotted with white and the rump feathers are relatively long giving a fluffy appearance. It has black wings which have a broad white strip formed by the broad white edges to feathers of the median and greater coverts, and the inner secondaries and tertials. The tail is black but the outer tail feathers have white edges and tips. The underparts are white, broken with a narrow black breast band. The females are similar to the males but have a pale rufous-buff breast band and chin and the face mask, supercilium and wing stripe are buffy brown. The bill and legs are black.

Voice
The main call of the pygmy batis is a ling series of repeated sharp high pitched whistles.

Distribution and habitat
The pygmy batis occurs in southern Ethiopia, extreme south eastern South Sudan, southern Somalia, eastern Uganda, inland  Kenya and north eastern Tanzania.

Also found in wooded and bushy grassland, but avoids riverine forest.

Habits
The pygmy batis is an active, arboreal bird which lives in pairs or small family groups. Its habits are considered to be likely to be similar to other savannah batises. They feed mainly within the foliage and glean most of their insect prey from leaves and twigs, with a small proportion taken on the wing. It will join other bird species in mixed foraging parties. The breeding biology is almost unknown but egg laying probably occurs in February and March.

References

pygmy batis
Birds of East Africa
Birds of the Horn of Africa
pygmy batis
Taxa named by Oscar Neumann
Taxonomy articles created by Polbot